The Type 293 radar was designed as a short-range aerial-search radar for surface ships in 1945. It used the same transmitter as the Type 277 surface-search radar, but used a new antenna design intended to cover the area above the ship to provide air warning instead of surface search.

Specifications

Notes

Bibliography

External links
 The RN Radar and Communications Museum

World War II British electronics
Naval radars
Royal Navy Radar
World War II radars